The 1980 Atlanta Braves season was the 15th season in Atlanta along with the 110th season as a franchise overall.

Offseason 
 November 20, 1979: Relief pitcher Al Hrabosky signed as a free agent.
 December 5, 1979: Barry Bonnell, Pat Rockett, and Joey McLaughlin were traded by the Braves to the Toronto Blue Jays for Chris Chambliss and Luis Gómez.
 December 6, 1979: Adrian Devine and Pepe Frías were traded by the Braves to the Texas Rangers for Doyle Alexander, Larvell Blanks and $50,000.

Regular season 
On August 6, umpire Jerry Dale ruled that Braves shortstop Rafael Ramírez did not step on second base while turning a double play. Manager Bobby Cox argued the call and confronted Dale while tobacco juice streamed out of his mouth. Cox was accused of spitting on the umpire.

Phil Niekro became the only pitcher in the history of the National League to lead the NL in losses for four consecutive seasons.

Season standings

Record vs. opponents

Notable transactions 
 June 3, 1980: Ken Dayley was drafted by the Braves in the 1st round (3rd pick) of the 1980 Major League Baseball Draft.
 July 1, 1980: Bill Haselrig (minors) was traded by the Braves to the New York Mets for Randy Johnson.
 August 8, 1980: Larvell Blanks was released by the Braves.

Roster

Player stats

Batting

Starters by position 
Note: Pos = Position; G = Games played; AB = At bats; H = Hits; Avg. = Batting average; HR = Home runs; RBI = Runs batted in

Other batters 
Note: G = Games played; AB = At bats; H = Hits; Avg. = Batting average; HR = Home runs; RBI = Runs batted in

Pitching

Starting pitchers 
Note: G = Games pitched; IP = Innings pitched; W = Wins; L = Losses; ERA = Earned run average; SO = Strikeouts

Relief pitchers 
Note: G = Games pitched; W = Wins; L = Losses; SV = Saves; ERA = Earned run average; SO = Strikeouts

Farm system

Awards and honors 
Phil Niekro, Roberto Clemente Award

League leaders 
Phil Niekro, National League leader, Losses

Notes

References 

1980 Atlanta Braves season at Baseball Reference

Atlanta Braves seasons
Atlanta Braves season
Atlanta